Georg von Kaufmann (24 May 1907 – 3 May 1972) was a German cross-country skier. He competed in the men's 18 kilometre event at the 1936 Winter Olympics.

References

1907 births
1972 deaths
German male cross-country skiers
Olympic cross-country skiers of Germany
Cross-country skiers at the 1936 Winter Olympics
Skiers from Munich